The Western Communities, also called the West Shore (e.g.  West Shore RCMP) or Westshore (e.g. Westshore Town Centre), is the suburban municipalities of Colwood, Langford, Metchosin and The Highlands, Langford and unincorporated districts west of Esquimalt Harbour and Portage Inlet, and south of the Malahat in the Capital Regional District of British Columbia, Canada. The Town of View Royal, which straddles Esquimalt Harbour, may also be included. It is an area of growing residential subdivisions and commercial centres.

West Shore Park & Recreation is governed by the West Shore Parks & Recreation Society's Board of Directors made up of representatives from the City of Colwood, the City of Langford, the District of Metchosin, the District of Highlands, the Juan de Fuca Electoral area and the Town of View Royal.

External links
West Shore Recreation
Western Communities Provincial Court

Populated places in the Capital Regional District
Greater Victoria